Balbir Singh Sidhu may refer to:

 Balbir Singh Sidhu (hockey player)
 Balbir Singh Sidhu (politician)